The Fayuan Mosque, also known as Dewai Mosque or Dewai Guanxiang Mosque,  is a mosque in Xicheng District, Beijing, China.

History
The mosque was originally constructed during the late Ming Dynasty. In 2003, the mosque underwent renovation which costed CNY8 million, funded by Xicheng District Government. It was then officially reopened to the public in September 2007.

Architecture
The mosque has a capacity of 300 worshipers which spans over an area of 4,000 m2. It was designed with a mixture of Chinese and Islamic architecture.

Transportation
The mosque is accessible within walking distance northeast of Jishuitan Station of Beijing Subway.

See also
 Islam in China
 List of mosques in China

References

Buildings and structures in Xicheng District
Mosques in Beijing